The German Angus is a modern German breed of beef cattle. It was bred in the 1950s in Germany by crossing Aberdeen Angus with various native German cattle breeds: German Black Pied, Deutsche Rotbunte, and Fleckvieh.

History 

The German Angus was bred in the 1950s by cross-breeding imported Aberdeen Angus stock from the United Kingdom with local German breeds; these were the German Black Pied or Deutsches Schwarzbuntes Niederungsrind, the Deutsche Rotbunte or Rotbuntes Niederungsrind, and the Fleckvieh or German Simmental. Since 1960 there has been some intromission of North American Angus.

In 1955 a breed society was established, and in 1956 a herd-book was started.

In 2017 the population was recorded as 9603 cows and 454 bulls.

Characteristics 

The German Angus is solid-coloured, black, brown or red, and is always naturally polled (hornless). Compared to the Fleckvieh it matures earlier, calves much more easily and has a higher calving rate, while the calf mortality rate is much lower. A comparative study of recentlyweaned calves of the two breeds found the German Angus to be more easily handled and more placid. It is larger and leaner than the original Scots Angus.

Use 

The German Angus is reared principally for beef. It may also be used in vegetation management.

References

Cattle breeds originating in Germany
Cattle breeds